Randolph Glasgow (born 5 July 1962) is a Trinidadian cricketer. He played in one List A and two first-class matches for Trinidad and Tobago in 1984/85.

See also
 List of Trinidadian representative cricketers

References

External links
 

1962 births
Living people
Trinidad and Tobago cricketers